Princess Dorothea of Denmark (29 June 1546 – 6 January 1617) was the Duchess of Brunswick-Lüneburg from 1561 until 1592 as the consort of Duke William the Younger. She was regent for her son George from 1592 to 1596.

Biography
Born in Kolding, Dorothea was the youngest child of Christian III of Denmark-Norway and Dorothea of Saxe-Lauenburg. She married William, Duke of Brunswick-Lüneburg on 12 October 1561.

When her husband died in 1592, she became regent for her under age son George. She had a deep mistrust of the councillors because of their ill management of her husband's estates during his insanity. Dorothea was known as a capable and energetic regent.

She died in Winsen, Germany at the age of 70.

Children who reached adulthood
 Sophia (30 October 1563 – 1639), married George Frederick, Margrave of Brandenburg-Ansbach
 Ernst (31 December 1564 – 2 March 1611)
 Elisabeth (19 October 1565 – 17 July 1621), married Frederick, Count of Hohenlohe-Langenburg
 Christian (19 November 1566 – 8 November 1633)
 Augustus (18 November 1568 – 1 October 1636)
 Dorothea (1 January 1570 – 15 August 1649), married Charles, Count Palatine of Birkenfeld
 Clara (16 January 1571 – 18 July 1658), married William, Count of Schwarzburg-Blankenburg
 Anne (22 March 1572 – 5 February 1601)
 Margaret (6 April 1573 – 7 August 1643), married Johann Casimir, Duke of Saxe-Coburg
 Friedrich (28 August 1574 – 10 December 1648)
 Marie (21 October 1575 – 8 August 1610)
 Magnus (30 August 1577 – 10 February 1632)
 Georg (17 February 1582 – 12 April 1641)
 Johann (23 June 1583 – 27 November 1628)
 Sybille (3 June 1584 – 5 August 1652), married Julius Ernest, Duke of Brunswick-Lüneburg

Ancestry

References

External links

Danish princesses
Norwegian princesses
16th-century women rulers
Duchesses of Brunswick-Lüneburg
1546 births
1617 deaths
People from Kolding
Children of Christian III of Denmark
Daughters of kings